The 2018 season of Clube Desportivo Primeiro de Agosto is the club's 40th season in the Girabola, the Angolan Premier football League and 40th consecutive season in the top flight of Angolan football. In 2018,  the club participated in the Girabola and the 2018 CAF Champions League.

1º de Agosto vs TP Mazembe post-match incident
Five people were reportedly killed after the 45.000 capacity crowd match on Saturday 15 September, at the Estádio 11 de Novembro, including two children who were trampled and/or suffocated to death while exiting the stadium. Before the match began, supporters called a radio station urging the organization to open all gates after the match ended for fear of a tragedy and after going through similar ordeals in the past. The Angolan Ministry of Youth and Sports in a statement regretted the incident, expressed condolences to the relatives and vowed to launch an investigation. On their part, the club's management promised to assist the relatives in funeral expenses.

Espérance Tunis vs 1º de Agosto
In 2018, they reached the semi-finals of the champions league were they were unfairly eliminated in a second-leg 4–2 defeat to Espérance Tunis with a heavily biased, shameful performance by referee Janny Sikazwe.

Squad information

Players

Staff

Pre-season transfers

Mid-season transfers

Overview

CAF Champions League

Results summary

Semi-finals
The heavily biased performance of Zambian referee Janny Sikazwe positively prevented D'Agosto from reaching the finals. The renowned referee had a disgraceful performance during the entire match, completely ignoring the rules of the game and clearly siding with the home team. The ice on the cake of his shameful performance occurred shortly before Espérance's final goal, when D'Agosto scored but he inexplicably disallowed the goal on a would-be push to the Tunisian goal-keeper. In the aftermath, Sikazwe was suspended by CAF on suspicion of corruption.

Quarter-finals

Group stage

First round

Preliminary round

Angolan League

League table

Results

Results summary

Results by round

Results overview

Match details

Season statistics

Appearances and goals

|-
! colspan="10" style="background:#DCDCDC; text-align:center" | Goalkeepers

|-
! colspan="10" style="background:#DCDCDC; text-align:center" | Defenders
|-

|-
! colspan="10" style="background:#DCDCDC; text-align:center" | Midfielders

|-
! colspan="10" style="background:#DCDCDC; text-align:center" | Forwards

|-
! colspan="10" style="background:#DCDCDC; text-align:center" | Opponents

|-
! colspan="10" style="background:#DCDCDC; text-align:center" | Total
|- align=center
| colspan="4"| Total || 462(123) || 47 || 308(79) || 31 || 154(42) || 16
|}

Scorers

Clean sheets

Season progress

See also
 List of C.D. Primeiro de Agosto players

External links
 Facebook profile
 Zerozero.pt profile
 Match schedule

References

C.D. Primeiro de Agosto seasons
Primeiro de Agosto